Woodbridge railway station is located on the Midland line in Perth, 15.5 kilometres from Perth station.

History
Woodbridge station opened in 1903 as West Midland, being renamed on 3 October 2004. It stands close to where the original Midland Junction station was located, with the original buildings shifted to Greenmount station in 1971.

Rail services

Woodbridge railway station is served by the Midland railway line on the Transperth network. This line goes between Midland railway station and Perth railway station. Midland line trains stop at the station every 10 minutes during peak on weekdays, and every 15 minutes during the day outside peak every day of the year except Christmas Day. Trains are half-hourly or hourly at night time. The station saw 61,138 passengers in the 2013-14 financial year.

Bus routes

References

Midland line, Perth
Railway stations in Australia opened in 1903
Railway stations in Perth, Western Australia
Woodbridge, Western Australia